The Wrexham Guardian was a weekly newspaper from Wrexham, a town in northern Wales. The first issue was published on 4 September 1869, and in February 1879, its name was changed to the North Wales Guardian. It continued under that title until ceasing publication in 1954.

References

External links
Wrexham Guardian at the National Library of Wales

Newspapers published in Wales
Defunct newspapers published in the United Kingdom
Defunct weekly newspapers